Derapur is a town in Kanpur Dehat district in the state of Uttar Pradesh, India. It is the headquarters of the Tehsil of the same name.

Transport 
Derapur is well connected by trains and roads.Rura  is nearest Railway Station (NCR) to Derapur town. Rura is towards north at a distance of  where super fast and express trains are available. It is connected towards east Kanpur Patna, Havrah and towards west Aligarh, Agra, Delhi etc. It is also connected by roads to Golden Quadrilateral National Highway of India at Mungisapur at a distance  towards south. It is situated on the south bank of the river Sengur

Kapaleshwar Temple

Inside the temple on the floor, from south to north in the direction  is installed a 1.40-meter-long mausoleum (Samadhi). Shivlinga is installed on the northern tip of the mausoleum (Samadhi). It is centre of faith of people. It was built in 1893. The crowd of devotees every Monday in the month of Sawan every year. A fair is also held here on Maha Shivaratri festival in the month of Falgun Hindu calendar every year.

Sankat Mochan Temple 

Hanuman Temple, also known as Sankat Mochan Hanuman Temple, is located on Mungisapur Road in Derapur. It was built by Mr. Suraj Narayan Gupta and his wife, Mrs. Uma Devi Gupta. Devotee from Derapur and nearby villages pay their respects to Lord Hanuman at the temple, and the Sunderkand Path is held on a regular basis.

Institutions 
Sub division and tehsil 
Circle officer police and police station
State Bank of India, Bank of Baroda
Post office and BSNL Exchange.

Notable people

Ram Nath Kovind is 14th President of India. He was ex-Governor of Bihar. Born at village Paraukh, Derapur, Kanpur Dehat district.

Educational institutions 
Galuapur Inter College—A government aided institution of sub division Derapur.

Festivals 
All national festivals, Holi, Diwali, Mahashivratri, Shri Krishna Janmashtami, Ramnavami, Makar Sankranti, Eid-ul-Fitr, Rakshabandhan, Hanuman jayanti and other local ones such as Nag-Panchmi, Navratri, Durga Puja are celebrated with enthusiasm. . Savitri vrat and Navratri vrat are main festival of women of town Derapur, At the time of savitri vrat women takes 101 round of banyan tree. Vijayadashami is a most famous festival of the town Derapur. It is celebrated continuously three days. A fair is also organized for 15 days.

Local Business 
 Princy Readymade Garments 
 Janki Jewellers
 RamJanki Vastralay
 Shukla Jewellers
 Archana Vastralay
 Gayatri Bartan Bhandar
 Radhe Radhe Jewellers
 Shraddha Jewellers
 Gupta Jewellers
 Maa Gayatri general Store
 Shankar Kirana Store
 Gayatri Sweet house
 Badnam sweet house
 Kusuma Vatika

Gallery

References

External links
Derapur

Cities and towns in Kanpur Dehat district